C. gigantea may refer to:
 Callindra gigantea, a moth species
 Calotropis gigantea, the crown flower, a plant species native to Indonesia, Malaysia, Philippines, Thailand and Sri Lanka
 Calvatia gigantea, the giant puffball, a puffball mushroom species
 Carnegiea gigantea, the saguaro, a large tree-sized cactus species
 Coreopsis gigantea, the giant coreopsis, a woody perennial plant native to California and Baja California
 Clanis gigantea, a synonym for Clanis undulosa gigantea, a moth species found in the southern Russian Far East, the Korean Peninsula and north-eastern China
 Condylactis gigantea, a tropical sea anemone species
 Coniogramme gigantea, a fern species
 Cupressus gigantea a conifer species found only in China
 Cyathea gigantea, a tree fern species native to northeastern to southern India, Sri Lanka, Nepal to Myanmar, Thailand and Laos

See also
 Gigantea (disambiguation)